The Munnekezijlstermolen is a smock mill in Munnekezijl, Friesland, Netherlands which was built in 1856 and is in working order. The mill is listed as a Rijksmonument.

History
The mill was built in 1836 for Hermannus Dijk, who was later killed in an accident in the city of Groningen. The mill was sold to the Sikkens family, and remained in their ownership until at least the mid-1990s. As well as grinding wheat, the mill was also a pearl barley mill. A whirlwind severely damaged the mill on 20 1930, blowing the sails off and damaging the stage. The pearl barley stones were removed in the 1930s. At one point, the mill was fitted with Patent sails. The mill ceased working commercially in 1961 and was threatened with demolition. However, it was decided that the price quoted was too expensive and the mill remained standing. It was restored in 1971 by millwright Doornbosch of Adorp, Groningen. The alternative name of Rust Roest was only given to the mill in the late 20th century. The mill was sold to the Stichting Erfgoed Kollumerland en Nieuwkruisland in the mid-1990s. It was restored to full working order in 1999.

Description

The Munnekekezijlstermolen is what the Dutch describe as a "stellingmolen". Attached to the base is the brick shed housing the auxiliary engine. The smock and cap are thatched. The mill is winded by tailpole and winch. The sails are Common sails, with the Fok system on the leading edges. The sails are carried on a cast-iron windshaft, which was cast in 1870 by De Prins van Oranje of The Hague, South Holland. The windshaft also carries the brake wheel, which has 59 cogs. This drives the wallower (33 cogs) at  the top of the upright shaft. At the bottom of the upright shaft, the great spur wheel, which has 85 cogs. The great spur wheel drives two pairs of millstones via a lantern pinion stone nut which have 28 staves each. A third pair of  diameter millstones is driven by the auxiliary diesel engine.

Millers
Hermannus Dijk (1836)
Sikkens family(1836-1961)

References for above:-

Public access

The Munnekezijlstermolen is open to the public on Saturdays.

References

Windmills in Friesland
Windmills completed in 1856
Smock mills in the Netherlands
Grinding mills in the Netherlands
Agricultural buildings in the Netherlands
Rijksmonuments in Friesland
Octagonal buildings in the Netherlands